Ian MacNeil may refer to:

 Ian MacNeil (politician), Conservative Party candidate in the 2004 Canadian federal election
 Ian MacNeil (scenic designer) (born 1960), stage set designer
 Ian MacNeil (ice hockey) (born 1977), Canadian ice hockey player
 Ian Roderick Macneil (1929–2010), American legal scholar
 Ian McNeill (1932–2017), Scottish footballer